Siyethemba Sithebe (born Siyethemba Mnguni; 6 January 1993) is a South African soccer player who plays as an attacking midfielder for South African Premier Division side Kaizer Chiefs and the South Africa national team. In 2018, he changed his surname from Mnguni to Sithebe.

Club career
In the summer of 2017, he signed for AmaZulu from Mbombela United.

International career
He made his international debut for South Africa on 8 October 2020 in a 1–1 draw with Namibia.

References

External links
 

1993 births
Living people
South African soccer players
People from Newcastle, KwaZulu-Natal
Soccer players from KwaZulu-Natal
Association football midfielders
Mbombela United F.C. players
AmaZulu F.C. players
Kaizer Chiefs F.C. players
South African Premier Division players
National First Division players
South Africa international soccer players